Fellows, foreign members and honorary fellows of the Royal Society elected in 2008.

Fellows 
Girish Agarwal
Dario Alessi
Michael Alpers
Fraser Armstrong
Alan Ashworth
John Irving Bell
Jon Blundy
Leszek Borysiewicz
Alexander Bradshaw
Stephen M. Cohen
Fergus Craik
David Deutsch
John Duncan
Russell Grant Foster
Brian Foster
Derek John Fray
Peter John Hudson
Christopher Alexander Hunter
Stephen Jackson
Nicholas Kaiser
Mark Kisin
Christopher John Lamb
Peter Simon Liss
Jan Löwe
Yiu-Wing Mai
John C. Marshall
Harvey Thomas McMahon
Anne O'Garra
Peter Robert Parham
Ian Parker
Michael Christopher Payne
Laurence Pearl
Matthew Rosseinsky
Robert Graham Goodwin Russell
Chris Toumazou
George Sawatzky
James Scott
Evgeny Konstantintinovich Sklyanin
Philip John Stephens
Claudio Daniel Stern
Michael Stratton
Roger Summons
Ulrike Tillmann
Kenneth Nigel Timmis
Chris Toumazou

Foreign members

J. Michael Bishop
William A. Catterall
Barbara Leonare Hohn
Ho-kwang Mao
Peter Marler
David Mumford
Richard Schrock
Susan Solomon

Honorary Fellow
 David Sainsbury, Baron Sainsbury of Turville

References

2008
2008 in science
2008 in the United Kingdom